State Street African Methodist Episcopal Zion Church is a historic African American church in Mobile, Alabama.  It is the oldest documented Methodist church building in Alabama. It is also one of two African American churches founded in the Methodist tradition in Mobile prior to the American Civil War.

History
The church was founded in 1829 as the African Church of the City of Mobile, a mission of the Methodist Episcopal Church South.  The original building burned and the current building was erected in 1854.  By 1855 the church had a congregation of 550 members, making it one of the most successful African American churches in Alabama.  Following the Civil War, the congregation joined the African Methodist Episcopal Zion Church.  The Methodist Episcopal Church South then challenged the right of the congregation to occupy the building.  Under the leadership of their second minister, Wilbur G. Strong, the congregation obtained legal title to the building in 1872.  It was added to the National Register of Historic Places on September 6, 1978, due to its architectural and historic significance.

References

National Register of Historic Places in Mobile, Alabama
Churches on the National Register of Historic Places in Alabama
Churches in Mobile, Alabama
African Methodist Episcopal Zion churches in Alabama
Churches completed in 1854
19th-century Methodist church buildings in the United States
African American Heritage Trail of Mobile
Properties on the Alabama Register of Landmarks and Heritage
Romanesque Revival church buildings in Alabama
Religious organizations established in 1829
1829 establishments in Alabama
Southern Methodist churches in the United States